Ivo Müller, (born Ivo Müller Jr. on 6 December 1977), is a Brazilian film and stage actor. Müller started his career in short films and school theater, and appeared in the 2012 independent Portuguese silent film Tabu, considered one of the 21's Century 100 greatest films according to the BBC.

He was born in Florianópolis, Santa Catarina on December 6, 1977. At the age of 15, he received a scholarship to an exchange student program in the US. His first acting lessons were taken during this experience abroad, when he went to learn English and wound up discovering himself as an actor.

Filmography

Film
2005 Outra Memória
2012 Tabu
2012 Dictionary, short film 
2014 Lascados
2014  O Tempo Que Leva, short film
2015 California
2015 O Diabo Mora Aqui
2015 My Hindu Friend
2017 The Artificial Humors, short film 
2017 La Muerte de Marga Maier
2019 Hebe: A Estrela do Brasil
2019 Cine Marrocos
2020 Skull: The Mask
2020 The Orphan, short
2021 Bia Plus One
2022 Proof Sheet

Television
2009 Mothern, GNT
2013 A Menina Sem Qualidades - MTV Brasil
2014 Psi - HBO 
2015 O Negócio - HBO
2016 Unidade Básica - Universal Channel
2017 The Great Journey - TV Cultura
2019 Hebe - Globoplay
2021 Passport to Freedom - Sony Pictures Television

Stage
2018/2019 Rilke, by poet Rainer Maria Rilke
2017 Huis Clos, by Jean Paul Sartre
2010/2018 Twelve Angry Men, by Reginald Rose - 2010 APCA Prize - best play
2010/2013 Letters to a Young Poet, based on Rainer Maria Rilke, adapted and directed by Ivo Müller 
2006 The Widows, by Arthur Azevedo, directed by Sandra Corveloni/Grupo Tapa
2006Amargo Siciliano, by Luigi Pirandello, directed by Eduardo Tolentino de Araújo 
2005 Camaradagem, by August Strindberg
2005 Hecuba, by Euripides
2005 Retratos e Canções, by Renato Andrade

Awards and nominations

Film

References

External links 

1977 births
Living people
Brazilian male film actors
21st-century Brazilian male actors
People from Florianópolis